The Fifth Government of the Lao People's Democratic Republic was established on 30 September 2002.

Ministries

Committees and others

References

Specific

Bibliography
Books:
 

Governments of Laos
2002 establishments in Laos
2006 disestablishments in Laos